Alexandrine Charlotte "Rosalie" de Rohan-Chabot (1763–1839), the duchesse de La Rochefoucauld was a French duchess and letter writer, known for the events of her life during the French Revolution.

She witnessed the infamous Reign of Terror at firsthand, including the assassination of her husband (and uncle) the Duc de La Rochefoucauld in Gisors during the September Massacres (they had married in 1780 and the marriage was childless) and the execution of her brother. In 1810 she remarried by wedding her relative, Boniface Louis Andre, Marquis de Castellane.

She was also the lover of U.S. ambassador William Short, the "adoptive son" of Thomas Jefferson. Their love affair was recorded in hundreds of letters, which document the lovers' pains of separation and their frustration with social norms. Likewise, their words of devotion are especially poetic and moving. The love letters are an authentic literary contribution, and offer personal insights into a turbulent era of world history.

References

Attribution

18th-century French women writers
18th-century French writers
French duchesses
French letter writers
Women letter writers
Alexandrine Charlotte
People of the French Revolution
1763 births
1839 deaths
18th-century letter writers
19th-century letter writers